Splash or Splash! or The Splash may refer to:

Common meanings
 Splash (fluid mechanics), sudden disturbances on the surface of water

Entertainment
 Splash (film), a 1984 fantasy film starring Tom Hanks and Daryl Hannah
 Splash, Too, the 1988 sequel
 Reality television series based on the Celebrity Splash! franchise
 Splash (American TV series), an American reality series
 Splash! (Chinese TV series), the official English title of a Chinese reality series
 Splash (South Korean TV series), a short-lived South Korean reality series
 Splash! (UK TV series), a British reality TV series
 Splash, the main character in the PBS Kids show Splash and Bubbles

Music

Artists
 Splash (German band)
 Splash (Hungarian band)
 Splash (Japanese band)
 Splash (South African band)
 Jack Splash, American record producer

Albums
 Splash (Flow album) (2003)
 Splash (Freddie Hubbard album) (1981)
 Splash (Jeremy Jay album) (2009)
 Splash (Satomi Fukunaga album) (1986)
 Splash (Sonia & Disappear Fear album) (2009)
 Splashes (album), by Archie Shepp's Quartet (1987)

Songs
 "Splash!" (B'z song), 2006
 "Splash" (Sub Focus song), 2010
 "Splash" (Colapesce & Dimartino song), 2023
 "Splash", by Can, 1974
 "Splash", by Chon from Grow, 2015
 "Splash", by Doug Wimbish from the album Trippy Notes for Bass, 1999
 "Splash", by Gwen Stefani from the album This Is What the Truth Feels Like, 2016
 "Splash", by Ho99o9 from the album United States of Horror, 2017
 "Splash", by Keziah Jones from the album African Space Craft, 1995
 "Splash", by Miles Davis from the album Circle in the Round, 1979
 "Splash", by Modern Eon, B-side of Mechanic, 1981
 "Splash", by John Legend, Jhené Aiko and Ty Dolla Sign from the album Legend, 2022

Other
 Splash! (festival), a hip hop and reggae festival in Germany
 Splash cymbal, a small cymbal used as part of a drum kit

Businesses
 Splash (fashion), the Middle East's largest fashion retailer
 Splash 105.5 FM Ibadan, a Nigerian radio station
 Splash Corporation, a Filipino personal care and food company
 Splash Entertainment, an animation studio that produces children's TV series
 Splash FM, a UK radio station
 Splash News, an entertainment news and photography agency
 Splash, a lifestyle magazine published by the Chicago Tribune

Transportation
 Suzuki Splash, an automobile
 Rinspeed Splash, a car that becomes a hydrofoil boat
 Splash (dinghy), a boat

Sports teams
 Anaheim Splash, a short-lived U.S. soccer team
 Asheville Splash, a defunct minor league women's soccer franchise

Other uses
 Splash! (academic outreach program), an academic outreach program by MIT
 SPLASH (conference), a computer science conference held by the SIGPLAN special interest group of the ACM
 Splash (website), an event management website
 V8 (beverage) Splash, a blend of fruit and vegetable juices
 The Splash, a statue by Peter Hodgkinson
 Splash (c. 1986–2005) – see List of captive orcas
 Splash, a Portuguese water dog owned by Ted Kennedy
 Splash (wrestling), a professional wrestling technique
 SPLASH, a summer school activity club in Wiltshire run by Wiltshire Police
 The Splash, a 1966 painting by British artist David Hockney
Splash, an alternative name for a depth charge

See also
 
 
 Last Splash, by The Breeders (1993)
 Splash! (disambiguation)